Finley Hamilton (June 19, 1886 – January 10, 1940) was a United States representative from Kentucky. He was born in Vincent, Owsley County, Kentucky. He attended the public schools and Berea College. He studied law and was admitted to the bar in 1915 and commenced practice in London, Kentucky.

Hamilton enlisted in the United States Army and served in the Signal Corps, with service in the Philippine Islands and Alaska, from 1907 to 1915. During the First World War, he reenlisted on March 18, 1916, and served in Company D, Three Hundred and Fifteenth Field Signal Battalion, Ninetieth Division, with service in France.

Hamilton was elected as a Democrat to the Seventy-third Congress (March 4, 1933 – January 3, 1935) to an at-large seat that was elected statewide on a general ticket, but was not a candidate for renomination in 1934. He resumed the practice of law and died in London, Kentucky in 1940. He was buried in Pine Grove Cemetery.

References

1886 births
1940 deaths
People from Laurel County, Kentucky
People from Owsley County, Kentucky
Berea College alumni
Democratic Party members of the United States House of Representatives from Kentucky
20th-century American politicians